Flemingia strobilifera, commonly known as the luck plant or wild hops, is a perennial flowering plant in the legume family, Fabaceae, and subfamily Faboideae. It is native to South, East and Southeast Asia.

Range
It is common in China, Taiwan, Bhutan, India, Nepal, Pakistan, Sri Lanka, Laos, Myanmar; Thailand, Vietnam, Indonesia, Malaysia, Papua New Guinea and Philippines.

Description
The erect, perennial shrub grows 1.5 m to 2 m tall. The leaves are ovate to oblong with pinnate venation and wavy margins. It flowers from October to December. Each small, white pea-shaped flower is enclosed by a pair of reniform flower bracts. The alternating bracts are arranged in 2 files along the raceme, and eventually turn papery as they dry out. The small, cylindrical pods release their tiny black and red seeds by explosive dehiscence.

Uses
In Bangladesh it is used as a traditional medicine to treat epilepsy, hysteria and fever. It is an essential part of the Bihu (গৰু বিহু) festival, during which the cattle are washed and gently beaten with twigs of this plant. It is known as makhiyoti (মাখিয়তী) in the north-eastern Indian state of Assam.

Ecology 
The species is invasive in New Caledonia.  In Panama it is  a problematic alien plant species

Gallery

References

Phaseoleae
Flora of Nepal